Guptill is the surname of the following people:
Ernest Wilmot Guptill (1919–1976), Canadian physicist 
Martin Guptill (born 1986), New Zealand cricketer 
Michael Guptill-Bunce (born 1989), New Zealand cricketer, cousin of Martin
Nancy Guptill, (1941–2020), Canadian politician 
Scott D. Guptill (1889–1949), Canadian politician
Stephen Guptill, American journalist and elderly advocate

See also
Watson-Guptill, American publisher of instructional books in the arts